The Junior Eurovision Song Contest 2010 was the eighth edition of the annual Junior Eurovision Song Contest and took place in Minsk, Belarus. It was held on 20 November 2010. The contest was won by Vladimir Arzumanyan from Armenia with the song Mama. This gave Armenia its first Junior Eurovision victory and its first victory in any Eurovision contest.

Location

The European Broadcasting Union (EBU) invited broadcasters to bid for the rights to host the Junior Eurovision Song Contest 2010. Belarus broadcaster National State Television and Radio Company of the Republic of Belarus (BRTC) won the rights to organise the contest over bids from Russia and Malta.

Under construction through 2009, the 15,000-spectator Minsk-Arena hosted the event. Belarus has twice previously won the Junior Eurovision Song Contest, which is, according to EBU Executive Supervisor Svante Stockselius, "one of Belarus' most popular television shows."

Format

Visual design
The theme art for the contest was revealed on 8 April 2010, consisting of multi-coloured circles, symbolising "different people, cultures and countries," that form the shape of wings, that symbolise "freedom, ease of flying, creative inspiration and rising above."
On 8 September, the mascots of the show were presented, being a bear and a wisent.

The stage, by Swedish stage designer Ulf Mårtensson, was unveiled on 15 July 2010, featuring five constructions in the shapes of wings. The hosts were also involved with each performance on their own dedicated section of the stage.

Theme art was also incorporated in the promotional billboards and posters featuring 11 "faces of Junior Eurovision" selected through casting procedure. Results of castings were revealed on 20 July 2010 and the 11 chosen ones were Belarus TV personalities Denis Kourian, Olga Barabanschikova, Irina Kazantseva, Andrey Bibikov, former JESC entrants Alexey Zhigalkovich, Ksenia Sitnik, Yuriy Demidovich, Alina Molosh, Daria Nadina as well as non-professionals Yulia Brazhinskaya and Ilya Ilmursky.

Presenters
On 6 September 2010, it was announced that Denis Kourian and Leila Ismailava would host the eighth edition of the contest.

Opening and interval acts
The show was opened with "Hello, Eurovision" performed by former Belarusian winners Ksenia Sitnik and Alexey Zhigalkovich. The interval acts included "Europe's Skies" performed by Alexander Rybak, all participants and Dmitry Koldun performing the specially-commissioned UNICEF song "A Day Without War",  and all winners of Junior Eurovision Song Contest at the time: Dino Jelusić, María Isabel, Ksenia Sitnik, The Tolmachevy Twins, Alexey Zhigalkovich, Bzikebi and Ralf Mackenbach, who performed a remixed medley of their winning entries and later presented the trophy to the winner at the end of the show.

Participants and results 

On 28 July 2010, the EBU announced the competing countries for the Junior Eurovision Song Contest 2010. A total of 14 countries competed, with Moldova making its début and Latvia and Lithuania returning. Cyprus and Romania withdrew from the contest. Sweden returned to the contest through Sveriges Television (SVT) after TV4 withdrew. The EBU's coordinator of the contest, Svante Stockselius, labelled SVT's return to the contest as a big achievement in terms of negotiations with possible participants and expressed hope that other Scandinavian broadcasters may also return to the show. Also, a special documentary "Kids of Eurovision" was filmed by BTRC about them.

Detailed voting results 

Each country gave their votes through a 50% jury and 50% televoting system, which decided their top ten songs using the points 12, 10, 8, 7, 6, 5, 4, 3, 2, and 1.

12 points
Below is a summary of all 12 points received. All countries were given 12 points at the start of voting to ensure that no country finished with nul points.

Spokespersons 

The order in which votes were cast during the 2010 contest along with the spokesperson who was responsible for announcing the votes for their respective country.

 Bernadras Garbaciauskas
 Paula Paraschiv
 Bram
 
 Elizabeth Arfush
 Robin Ridell
 Philip Mazurov
 Ralfs Eilands
 Laura Omloop
 Nadia Sargsyan
 Francesca Zarb
 Anastasiya Butyugina
 Giorgi Toradze
 Sara Markoska

Broadcasts 

Each national broadcaster also sent a commentator to the contest, in order to provide coverage of the contest in their own native language. Details of the commentators and the broadcasting station for which they represented are also included in the table below.

Official album

Junior Eurovision Song Contest 2010 is a compilation album put together by the European Broadcasting Union, and was released by Universal Music Group on 19 November 2010. The album features all the songs from the 2010 contest, along with karaoke versions.

See also
 Eurovision Song Contest 2010
 Eurovision Young Musicians 2010

Notes

References

External links

Junior Eurovision pages at BTRC website
Junior Eurovision Song Contest 2010 on the Official Website of the Republic of Belarus

 
2010
2010 in Belarus
2010s in Minsk
2010 song contests
Events in Minsk
November 2010 events in Europe